At least three ships of the Hellenic Navy have borne the name Sachtouris after the Greek naval hero Georgios Sachtouris:

 , a gunboat built in 1834.
 , a  launched in 1940 as HMS Peony and transferred to Greece and renamed in 1943. She was scrapped in 1952.
 , a  launched in 1945 as USS Arnold J. Isbell she was transferred to Greece in 1974 and renamed. She was scrapped in 2002.

Hellenic Navy ship names